The Bishop of Dunwich is an episcopal title which was first used by an Anglo-Saxon bishop between the seventh and ninth centuries and is currently used by the suffragan bishop of the Diocese of St Edmundsbury and Ipswich.  The title takes its name after Dunwich in the English county of Suffolk, which has now largely been lost to the sea.

In about 630 or 631 a diocese was established by St. Felix for the Kingdom of the East Angles, with his episcopal seat initially, briefly established at Soham before being transferred to Dunwich on the Suffolk coast.  There is a possibility the unidentified Dommoc may be Dunwich, but this is yet to be proved.  In 672 the diocese was divided into the sees of Dunwich and Elmham by St. Theodore, Archbishop of Canterbury.

The line of bishops of Dunwich continued until it was interrupted by the Danish Viking invasions in the late ninth and early tenth centuries.  By the mid 950s the sees of Dunwich and Elmham were reunited under one bishop, with the episcopal see at Elmham.

List of bishops

Footnotes
  The current list of Anglo-Saxon bishops is primarily compiled by the 3rd edition of the Handbook of British Chronology. The earlier 2nd edition mentioned two others: Alric, probably bishop of Dunwich and Husa, bishop of Dunwich or Elmham. These two are no longer considered to have been bishops and as such are not listed in the 3rd edition.

References

External links